The 12th New Hampshire Infantry Regiment was an infantry regiment that served in the Union Army during the American Civil War.  It was also a unit that existed for a time following the Revolutionary War (see the History of Fitzwilliam, NH (Norton), p. 351-353).

Service
The 12th New Hampshire Infantry was organized in Concord, New Hampshire, and mustered in for a three-year enlistment on September 10, 1862, under the command of Colonel Joseph Haydn Potter.

The regiment was attached to Casey's Division, Military District of Washington, to December 1862. 2nd Brigade, 3rd Division, III Corps, Army of the Potomac, to June 1863. 1st Brigade, 2nd Division, III Corps, Army of the Potomac, to July 1863. Marston's Command, Point Lookout, Maryland, District of St. Mary's, to April 1864. 2nd Brigade, 2nd Division, XVIII Corps, Department of Virginia and North Carolina, to December 1864. 2nd Brigade, 3rd Division, XXIV Corps, Department of Virginia, to June 1865.

The 12th New Hampshire Infantry mustered out of service June 21, 1865.

Detailed service

Service at Gettysburg

On July 2, 1863, the 12th New Hampshire was heavily engaged north of the Klingel Farm, facing attack by Wilcox's Alabama brigade.  The regiment had 224 men on the field that day, of whom 26 were killed and 73 were wounded (an additional six men would die of their wounds).  Captain John F. Langley (Company F) was in command, and was wounded when the regiment was ordered to withdraw.  Lieutenant William H. H. Fernel (Company I) took command and was able to rescue some 50 Union soldiers who were captured during the withdrawal.  The following day, only 50 men were fit for duty under the command of Captain Thomas E. Barker (Company B).  Placed near the center of the Union line, they helped repulse Pickett's charge.

Casualties
The regiment lost a total of 320 men during service; 11 officers and 170 enlisted men killed or mortally wounded, 1 officer and 138 enlisted men died of disease.

Commanders
 Colonel Joseph Haydn Potter
 Colonel Thomas E. Barker
 Lieutenant Colonel John F. Marsh
 Lieutenant Colonel George D. Savage
 Captain John F. Langley - commanded at the battle of Gettysburg, July 2, 1863; wounded in action
 Captain Thomas E. Barker - commanded at the battle of Gettysburg, July 3, 1863

See also

 List of New Hampshire Civil War units
 New Hampshire in the American Civil War

References
 
 Dyer, Frederick H.  A Compendium of the War of the Rebellion (Des Moines, IA:  Dyer Pub. Co.), 1908.
 Fahey, J. P.  Mustered!:  Foot Soldiers of the 12th (Port Richey, FL:  Hampshire House), 2001.  
 Musgrove, Richard W.  Autobiography of Capt. Richard W. Musgrove (S.l.:  The Author), 1921.
Attribution

External links
 12th New Hampshire Infantry monument at Gettysburg
 History of Fitzwilliam (Norton), 1888

Military units and formations established in 1862
Military units and formations disestablished in 1865
12th New Hampshire Volunteer Infantry
1862 establishments in New Hampshire